The following list of Carnegie libraries in Nebraska provides detailed information on United States Carnegie libraries in Nebraska, where 69 libraries were built from 68 grants (totaling $707,488) awarded by the Carnegie Corporation of New York from 1899 to 1917.

Key

Carnegie libraries

Notes

References

Note: The above references, while all authoritative, are not entirely mutually consistent. Some details of this list may have been drawn from one of the references without support from the others.  Reader discretion is advised.

Nebraska
Libraries
 
Libraries